Lesya Ukrainka (born Larysa Petrivna Kosach, ;  – ) was one of Ukrainian literature's foremost writers, best known for her poems and plays. She was also an active political, civil, and feminist activist.

Among her best-known works are the collections of poems On the wings of songs (1893), Thoughts and Dreams (1899), Echos (1902), the epic poem Ancient fairy tale (1893), One word (1903), plays Princess (1913), Cassandra (1903—1907), In the Catacombs (1905), and Forest Song (1911).

Biography

Lesya Ukrainka was born in 1871 in the town of Novohrad-Volynskyi (now Zviahel) of Ukraine. She was the second child of Ukrainian writer and publisher Olha Drahomanova-Kosach, better known under her literary pseudonym Olena Pchilka. Ukrainka's father was Petro Kosach (from the Kosača noble family), head of the district assembly of conciliators, who came from the northern part of Chernihiv province. After completing high school in Chernihiv Gymnasium, Kosach studied mathematics at the University of Petersburg. Two years later, her father moved to Kyiv University and graduated with a law degree. In 1868 he married Olha Drahomaniv, who was the sister of his friend Mykhailo Drahomanov, a well-known Ukrainian scientist, historian, philosopher, folklorist, and public figure. Her father was devoted to the advancement of Ukrainian culture and financially supported Ukrainian publishing ventures. Lesya Ukrainka had three younger sisters, Olha, Oksana, and Isydora, and a younger brother, Mykola. Ukrainka was very close to her uncle Drahomanov, her spiritual mentor and teacher, as well as her brother Mykhailo, known under the pseudonym Mykhailo Obachny, whom she called "Mysholosie" after their parents' joint nickname for both of them.

Lesya inherited her father's physical features, eyes, height, and build. Like her father, she was highly principled, and they both held the dignity of the individual in high regard. Despite their many similarities, Lesya and her father were different in that her father had a gift for mathematics, but no gift for languages; on the contrary, Lesya had no gift for mathematics, but she knew English, German, French, Italian, Greek, Latin, Polish, Russian, Bulgarian, and her native Ukrainian.

Lesya's mother, a poet, wrote poetry and short stories for children in Ukrainian. She was also active in the women's movement and published a feminist almanac. Ukrainka's mother played a significant role in her upbringing. The Ukrainian language was the only language used in the household, and to enforce this practice, the children were educated by Ukrainian tutors at home, to avoid schools that taught Russian as the primary language. Ukrainka learned how to read at the age of four, and she and her brother Mykhailo could read foreign languages well enough to read literature in the original.

By the time she was eight, Ukrainka wrote her first poem, "Hope," which was composed in reaction to the arrest and exile of her aunt, Olena Kosach, for taking part in a political movement against the tsarist autocracy.  In 1879, her entire family moved to Lutsk. That same year her father started building houses for the family in the nearby village of Kolodiazhne.  It was at this time that her uncle, Mykhailo Drahomanov, encouraged her to study Ukrainian folk songs, folk stories, and history, as well to peruse the Bible for its inspired poetry and eternal themes.  She also was influenced by the well-known composer Mykola Lysenko, as well as the famous Ukrainian dramatist and poet Mykhailo Starytsky.

At age thirteen, her first published poem, "Lily of the Valley," appeared in the magazine Zorya in Lviv.  It was here that she first used her pseudonym, which was suggested by her mother because, in the Russian Empire, publications in the Ukrainian language were forbidden. Ukrainka's first collection of poetry had to be published secretly in western Ukraine and snuck into Kyiv under her pseudonym. At this time, Ukrainka was well on her way of becoming a pianist, but due to tuberculosis of the bone, she did not attend any outside educational establishment.  The writing was to be the main focus of her life.

Since the beginning of the 90s, the poetess has been communicating with the Poltava region. From the summer of 1893 to the middle of 1906, Lesya lived almost every summer in Hadiach and near the city, in the Green Grove. The writing of many works is marked by this place; in particular, the legend "Robert Bruce, King of Scotland" was written here. It was here that Lesya befriended the teacher A. S. Makarova, with whom she later corresponded, the latter left memories of the poetess.

The poems and plays of Ukrainka are associated with her belief in her country's freedom and independence. Between 1895 and 1897, she became a member of the Literary and Artistic Society in Kyiv, which was banned in 1905 because of its relations with revolutionary activists. In 1888, when Ukrainka was seventeen, she and her brother organized a literary circle called Pleyada (The Pleiades), which they founded to promote the development of Ukrainian literature and translation of foreign classics into Ukrainian. The organization was based on the French school of poesy, the Pleiade. Their gatherings took place in different homes and were joined by Mykola Lysenko, Petro Kosach, Kostiantyn Mykhalchuk, Mykhailo Starytsky, and others. One of the works they translated was Nikolai Gogol's Evenings on a Farm Near Dykanka.

Taras Shevchenko and Ivan Franko were the main inspiration of her early poetry, which was associated with the poet's loneliness, social isolation and adoration of the Ukrainian nation's freedom. Her first collection of poetry, Na krylakh pisen''' (On the Wings of Songs), was published in 1893.  Since Ukrainian publications were banned by the Russian Empire, this book was published in Western Ukraine, which was part of Austria-Hungary at the time, and smuggled into Kyiv.

Ukrainka's illness made it necessary for her to travel to places where the climate was dry, and, as a result, she spent extended periods of time in Germany, Austria, Italy, Bulgaria, Crimea, the Caucasus, and Egypt.  She loved experiencing other cultures, which was evident in many of her literary works, such as The Ancient History of Oriental Peoples, originally written for her younger siblings.  The book was published in Lviv, and Ivan Franko was involved in its publication. It included her early poems, such as "Seven Strings," "The Starry Sky," "Tears-Pearls," "The Journey to the Sea," "Crimean Memories," and "In the Children's Circle."

Ukrainka also wrote epic poems, prose dramas, prose, several articles of literary criticism, and several sociopolitical essays. She was best known for her plays Boyarynya (1914; The Noblewoman), a psychological tragedy centered on the Ukrainian family in the 17th century, which refers directly to Ukrainian history, and Lisova pisnya (1912; The Forest Song), the characters of which include mythological beings from Ukrainian folklore.

In 1897, while being treated in Yalta, Ukrainka met Serhiy Merzhynsky, an official from Minsk who was also receiving treatment for tuberculosis.  The two fell in love, and her feelings for Merzhynsky were responsible for her showing a different side of herself.  Examples include "Your Letters Always Smell of Withered Roses," "To Leave Everything and Fly to You," and "I'd Like to Wind around You Like Ivy," which were unpublished in her lifetime.  Merzhynsky died with Ukrainka at his bedside on 3 March 1901. She wrote the entire dramatic poem "Oderzhyma" ("The Possessed") in one night at his deathbed.

Lesya Ukrainka actively opposed Russian tsarism and was a member of Ukrainian Marxist organizations.  In 1902 she translated The Communist Manifesto into Ukrainian.  She was briefly arrested in 1907 by tsarist police and remained under surveillance thereafter.

In 1907, Lesya Ukrainka married Klyment Kvitka, a court official, who was an amateur ethnographer and musicologist.  They settled first in Crimea, then moved to Georgia.

Ukrainka died on 1 August 1913 at a health resort in Surami, Georgia.

 Creative activity 

 Poetry 
Larysa Kosach began to write poetry at the age of nine: Nadiya wrote her poetry under the influence of the news about the fate of her aunt Elena Antonovna Kosach (married to Teslenko-Prykhodko), who had been exiled for participating in the revolutionary movement. In 1884 the poems "Lily of the Valley" and "Sappho" were first published in the Lviv magazine "Zorya" and the name Lesya Ukrainka was recorded; In the following reprints, Lesya added a dedication to her brother's poem "Sappho": "Dear Shura Sudovshchikova in memory." In 1885 a collection of her translations from Mykola Gogol (made together with Mykhailo) was published in Lviv.

Lesya Ukrainka's literary activity revived in the mid-1890s, when the Kosachs moved to Kyiv, and she became a co-founder of the Pleiades literary circle, surrounded by the Lysenko and Starytsky families. At the request of the Pleiades, in 1889 she compiled her famous List of World Literature for translation. In 1892, Heinrich Heine's Book of Songs was published in Lviv, translated by Lesya Ukrainka (together with M. Slavinsky). The first collection of her original poems "On the Wings of Songs" appeared in Lviv (1893), the second edition in Kyiv (1904), the second collection "Thoughts and Dreams" (1899), the third "Reviews" (1902) – in Chernivtsi.

After that, Lesya Ukrainka worked for a decade and created more than a hundred poems, half of which were never published during her lifetime.

Lesya Ukrainka entered the canon of Ukrainian literature primarily as a poet of courage and struggle. Her thematically rich lyrics are somewhat conditionally (due to the relationship of motives) divided into personal, landscape, and civic. The main themes of her early lyrical poetry: the beauty of nature, love for her native land, personal experiences, the purpose of the poet and the role of the poetic word, social and social motives. In the first works the influences of Taras Shevchenko, Panteleimon Kulish, Mykhailo Starytsky, and Heine are noticeable, the clear influences of Olena Pchilka and Mykhailo Drahomanov (pseudonym – Ukrainian) on the choice of motives are visible.

And the poetry "Contra spem spero!" (1890) characterizes the ancient understanding of valor (arete), brilliant mastery of mythological illusions, self-creation of a woman warrior. It is this aspect of creativity for many years determinate in the tone of scientific "forestry". These are the main motives of the poems "To Comrades", "Comrades in Memory", "Sinner", "Slavus – Sclavus", "Fiat nox", "Epilogue" and many others. The motif of freedom takes on a variety of colors: from disobedience to the traditional understanding of the empire to the individual choice of modus vivendi, which means discovering the truth and serving it. Betrayal on any level is identified with tragedy, with the act of Medea. The lyrics of thirst and hidden triumph associated with the inability to realize their love, exposes the scheme of chivalrous love. The lyrical heroine is a knight who sings to her lady of the heart. The eroticism of such poems as "I would like to embrace you like an ivy", "Your letters always smell of withered roses" are mystical praises in honor of the divine mistress.

 Drama 
In the second half of the 1890s, Kosach turned to drama. Her first drama, The Blue Rose (1896), from the life of the Ukrainian intelligentsia, expands on the theme of Ukrainian drama, which until then had portrayed mostly the peasantry. The drama testified to Lesya Ukrainka's entry into the modern world — first of all, the world of the symbol — and her rather free "feeling." To cover the topic of human norm and abnormality, the writer thoroughly prepared and studied the issues, consulted with a psychiatrist Oleksandr Drahomanov. The philosophical discourse of drama, imposing on Hauptmann's work, presents not only madness as a form of freedom, but also a certain longing for the body.

 Prose 
Fiction has a special place in Lesya Ukrainka's literary heritage. The first stories from rural life ("Such is her fate", "Holy evening!", "Spring songs") are connected in content and language with folk songs. In the genre of fairy tales written "Three Pearls", "Four tales of green noise", "Lily", "Trouble will teach", "Butterfly". The stories "Pity" and "Friendship" are marked by sharp drama. The Ukrainian woman's death story "Ekbal Hanem", intended to depict the psychology of an Arab woman, remained unfinished.

 Research of life and creativity 
Museums

Lesya Ukrainka's life and work are studied by the Lesya Ukrainka Research Institute.

 Lesya Ukrainka Museum in Kyiv
 Lesya Ukrainka Museum in Kolodyazhny
 Lesya Ukrainka Museum in Zviahel
 Lesya Ukrainka Museum in Suram
 Lesya Ukrainka Museum in Yalta
 Museum of the Kosach family in Zviahel

Legacy

There are many monuments to Lesya Ukrainka in Ukraine and many other former Soviet Republics. Particularly in Kyiv, there is a main monument at the boulevard that bears her name and a smaller monument in the Mariinskyi Park (next to Mariinskyi Palace). There is also a bust in Qaradağ raion of Azerbaijan. One of the main Kyiv theaters, the Lesya Ukrainka National Academic Theater is colloquially referred to simply as Lesya Ukrainka Theater.

Under initiatives of local Ukrainian diasporas, there are several memorial societies and monuments to her throughout Canada and the United States, most notably a monument on the campus of the University of Saskatchewan in Saskatoon, Saskatchewan.  There is also a bust of Ukrainka in Soyuzivka in New York State.

Each summer since 1975, Ukrainians in Toronto gather at the Lesya Ukrainka monument in High Park to celebrate her life and work.

Ukrainian composer Tamara Maliukova Sidorenko (1919–2005) set several of Ukrainka's poems to music.

The National Bank of Ukraine released a ₴200 banknote depicting Lesya Ukrainka.

According to image consultant Oleh Pokalchuk, Ukrainka's hairstyle inspired the over-the-head braid of Yulia Tymoshenko.

According to Google Trends, Lesya Ukrainka was in 2020 the third in the ranking of Ukrainian women search queries in Google Search in Ukraine (the top two was Tina Karol and Olha Polyakova).

On 16 November 2022 Pushkin Avenue in Dnipro was renamed Lesya Ukrainka Avenue.

English translationsThe Babylonian Captivity, (play), from Five Russian Plays, With One From the Ukrainian, Dutton, NY, 1916. from Archive.org;
 In the Catacombs (play) translated by David Turow;
 Short stories; “Christmas Eve”, “The Moth”, “Spring Songs”, “It is Late”, “The Only Son”, “The School”, “Happiness”, “A City of Sorrow”, “The Farewell”, “Sonorous Strings”, “A Letter to a Distant Shore”, “By the Sea”, “The Blind Man”, “The Apparition”, “The Mistake”, “A Moment”, “The Conversation” and “The Enemies” translated by Roma Franko;The Forest Song, (play), in "In a Different Light: A Bilingual Anthology of Ukrainian Literature Translated into English by Virlana Tkacz and Wanda Phipps as Performed by Yara Arts Group", compiled and edited by Olha Luchuk, Sribne Slovo Press, Lviv 2008.

 Adaptations and creativity based on motives 

 Theatrical adaptations of works 
 1994 Yara's Forest Song directed by Virlana Tkacz with Yara Arts Group at La MaMa Experimental Theatre in New York and Les Kurbas Theatre in Lviv
 2013 Fire Water Night directed by Virlana Tkacz with Yara Arts Group at La MaMa Experimental Theatre in New York

 Films adaptations of works 

 "Forest Song" (1961), a film by Viktor Ivchenko
 "Fireplace Master" (1971), a film by Mstislav Dzhingzhiristy
 "Cassandra" (1974), film by Yuriy Nekrasov, Serhiy Smyan
 "Forest Song" (1976), cartoon by Alla Grachova
 "Forest Song. Mavka" (1981), a film by Yuriy Ilyenko
 "The Temptation of Don Juan" (1985), a film by Vasyl Levin and Grigory Koltunov
 "Blue Rose" (1988), a two-part film by Oleg Biima
 "Orgy" (1991), television play
 "On the field of blood. Aceldama" (2001), a film by Yaroslav Lupiy
 "Mavka. The Forest Song" (2022) a 3D cartoon by Oleksandra Ruban.

See also

 Lesya Ukrainka Theater
 The Forest Song

References

External links
 Internet Encyclopedia of Ukraine: Lesya Ukrainka
Sasha Dovzhyk, 'Subverting the Canon of Patriarchy: Lesya Ukrainka’s Revisionist Mythmaking', Los Angeles Review of Books'', 2021
 Website of the Ukrainian Book Institute with links to the 14 volumes of the new critical edition of the complete works of the autor, texts available as pdf documents via Google Drive
 

 Women's Voices in Ukrainian Literature: Lesya Ukrainka by Roma Franko
 Lesya Ukrainka Statue in High Park, Toronto, Ontario, Canada
 The site: "Let the World know about our Lesya" the result of the students schools #3 of Sevastopol in the project "Lesya-140".

1871 births
1913 deaths
People from Zviahel
People from Volhynian Governorate
Ukrainian women poets
Ukrainian women writers
Ukrainian dramatists and playwrights
Ukrainian communists
Translators to Ukrainian
Ukrainian democracy activists
20th-century deaths from tuberculosis
Tuberculosis deaths in Georgia (country)
Women dramatists and playwrights
Communist women writers
Ukrainian socialist feminists
Burials at Baikove Cemetery
19th-century translators
19th-century women writers
19th-century Ukrainian poets
20th-century Ukrainian poets
20th-century women writers
Ukrainian-language writers